Jan Mikusiński (April 3, 1913 Stanisławów – July 27, 1987 Katowice) was a Polish mathematician based at the University of Wrocław known for his pioneering work in mathematical analysis.

Mikusiński developed an operational calculus – known as the Calculus of Mikusiński (MSC 44A40), which is relevant for solving differential equations. His operational calculus is based upon an algebra of the convolution of functions with respect to the Fourier transform. From the convolution product he goes on to define what in other contexts is called the field of fractions or a quotient field. These ordered pairs of functions Mikusiński calls "operators", the "Mikusiński operators".

He is also well known for Mikusinski's cube, the Antosik–Mikusinski theorem, and Mikusinski convolution algebra.

A street in Katowice is named after Mikusiński.

Selected publications
 An Introduction to Analysis - From Number to Integral. Wiley 1993
 The Operational Calculus. Pergamon Press, Oxford 1983
 Operatorenrechnung. VEB Deutscher Verlag der Wissenschaften, Berlin 1957.
 The Bochner Integral. Birkhäuser 1978.
 with Piotr Antosik, Roman Sikorski: Theory of distributions – the sequential approach. Elsevier 1973.
 with Stanisław Hartman: The theory of Lebesgue Measure and Integration. Pergamon Press, Oxford 1961.

See also
Convolution quotient
Daniell integral

External links
 Caricature of Jan Mikusinski
 Rachunek Operatorow (1944)(Operational Calculus in Polish)
 Part 1
 Part 2 1983 (English)
 Mikusinski archived

1913 births
1987 deaths
20th-century  Polish mathematicians
Recipients of the State Award Badge (Poland)
People from Ivano-Frankivsk